Hilden is a surname. Notable people with the surname include:

 Elizabeth Hilden (born 1969), American pornography model and tattoo and piercing parlor owner
 Jukka Hilden (born 1980), Finnish stunt performer
 Julie Hilden (1968–2018), American writer and lawyer
 Jytte Hilden (born 1942), Danish chemical engineer and politician